Dawood Saad Salman Mohamed Saad (born 9 July 1986 in Riffa, Bahrain) is Bahraini footballer.

He is playing for home team Riffa in Bahraini Premier League. He plays as a defender. He was called to Bahrain national football team at 2011 AFC Asian Cup, hosted Qatar (in Doha capital and Al Rayyan).

References

External links 
 

1986 births
Living people
Bahraini footballers
Bahrain international footballers
Association football midfielders
2011 AFC Asian Cup players